Blair of the Mounties is a syndicated 15-minute radio series about the adventures of Sergeant James Blair of the North-West Mounted Police. A total of 39 episodes of this Northern genre series were produced. The show was heard on radio stations for more than twenty years. An Oakland, California radio station broadcast it in July 1934 and a 1957 issue of Broadcasting magazine listed Blair of the Mounties as still being available for release to radio stations.

Writer and main actor
Colonel Rhys Davies was the series writer, as well as the actor who portrayed Blair. He had served in the North-West Mounted Police during the Yukon gold rush and then transferred to the British military intelligence service during the First War War.  Davies based the series on his own experiences as a Canadian Mountie, and as a member of the British Intelligence Corps.

In addition to his law enforcement and military service Davies wrote both radio scripts and novels.

Series premise
Sergeant (later Inspector) James Blair, played by Colonel Rhys Davies, served in various Canadian locations, including Dawson City and near Hudson’s Bay Company fur trading posts. He was often assisted by Corporal Marshal, played by Jack Abbott. Blair also spent time in Great Britain, where he helped solve crimes.

The radio series had few sound effects, and one reviewer stated that the writing was amateurish, and "the actor playing Blair comes off as a trifle stuffy", though another source describes it as a "fascinating series" based on Colonel Davies’ lifetime of exciting adventures.

Distribution
Blair of the Mounties was broadcast in the United States, Canada and Australia. It was originally distributed by Walter Biddick Co. of Los Angeles, California, but in 1937 the series was sold to United Broadcasting Sales Ltd. of Calgary, Alberta.

In 1949 the series was available to individual stations as a 15-minute, three times a week show. The broadcasting price per episode was $5, amounting to $15 a week. In 1957 United Broadcasting Sales Ltd. was offering Blair of the Mounties to four western providences in Canada.

Episodes

References

External links
Blair of the Mounties on YouTube

1930s American radio programs
Royal Canadian Mounted Police in fiction
Yukon in fiction